The Boy with the Topknot is a 2017 British romantic drama film starring Sacha Dhawan and Joanna Vanderham. The film is based on Sathnam Sanghera's memoir of the same name. The film premiered on BBC. The film is about a Punjabi man who brings his English girlfriend home.

Cast 
Sacha Dhawan as Sathnam
Himmut Singh Dhatt as young Sathnam, the boy with the topknot
Joanna Vanderham as Laura
Deepti Naval as Sathnam's mother
Kiran Sonia Sawar as young Sathnam's mother
Anupam Kher as Sathnam's father
Sam Otto as young Sathnam's father
Jaz Deol as Rajah
Anjli Mohindra as Bindi
Shaheen Khan as Aunt Sharanjit
Manpreet Bambra as young Aunt Sharanjit
Dinita Gohil as Kiran Chahal
Sharon Duncan-Brewster as Carol

Release 
The Guardian gave the film a rating of three out of five stars and wrote that "This adaptation of Sathnam Sanghera’s memoir of growing up Sikh in the 60s is brave and funny ... but romantic additions detract from the love letter to a family". The Telegraph gave the film the same rating.

Awards and nominations

References

External links 

2017 films
2017 television films
2017 romantic drama films
British romantic drama films
2010s British films
British drama television films